Saint-Jules is the name of several communities. It may refer to:

Canada
 the former Saint-Jules, Quebec which amalgamated into the municipality of Cascapédia–Saint-Jules in 1999
 Saint-Jules, Quebec, a parish municipality